The Madrasah In’aamiyyah Camperdown, is an institute of higher Islamic learning and teaching based in Durban, South Africa. A number of students from the United States, Canada, Belgium, India, Sri Lanka, Pakistan, Malaysia, Philippines, Mozambique, Malawi, Zambia and Australia are receiving education at the Madrasah.

Education Pattern

The  offers the following courses:

Hifdhul Qur'an (memorizing the Qur'an): Consisting of 3 years. (depending on student capabilities year varies.)
I’daadiyah: Introductory phase for Aalim course.
Imaam / Khatib Training: Consisting of 1–3 years. This is to equip a person to be an Imaam and fulfill basic Islamic requirements of the community, for example, perform Salaat, Jumu’ah, Nikah, etc.
Qiraat Hafs: (normal reading), Qiraat Sab’a: (7 dialects) and Asharah: (10 dialects).
Aalim Course: Consisting of 6 years. It is equivalent to BA (Hons).
Mufti course: Consisting of minimum 2 years.
Specialty in Hadith: Consisting of 1 year.

Syllabus of the Aalim course

A brief review of the subjects of the Aalim Course is given below:
First Year: Mainly Learning Arabic.
Second Year: Continue with learning Arabic, Fiqh, Usool-e-Fiqh and Tarjuma-e-Qur'an
Third Year: Usool-e-Fiqh, Tarjuma-e-Qur'an, History
Fourth Year: Fiqh, Usool-e-Fiqh, Tafseer
Fifth Year: Hadith, Usool-e-Hadith, Fiqh
Sixth Year: Sihaah-e-Sitta, All Sahih Books

Publications
The Madrasah has published many books and articles under the authority of Academy for Islamic Research, Madrasah In’aamiyyah. These include:
From the Treasures of Arabic Morphology by Maulana Ebrahim Muhammad
A Disastrous Problem Faced by the Youth by Maulana Abdullah Ismail
Etiquettes of Marital Relations

See also
 Ebrahim Desai

References

External links
Madrasah In'aamiyyah's website
Islamic question and answer
Dar al-Mahmood

Deobandi Islamic universities and colleges
Islamic organizations in Africa
Education in Durban
Islamic education in South Africa